Karl Oenike (1862–1924) was a renowned German landscape painter, who participated in various scientific expeditions in South America during the years 1887-1891 as painter and photographer. He wrote detailed diaries,  made topographical maps, drawings, sketches, watercolors, oil paintings and photos during these expeditions, which give a valuable perspective of remote regions and populations, and of the difficulties encountered by German explorers in the 1880s. Few artists in the exotic art genre have depicted better the “magic of the forest” in his paintings.

Life and work
Karl Oenike was born in Berlin on April 9, 1862. He studied art in the Berliner Kunstakademie from 1879 to 1886 under Prof. Eugen Bracht :de:Eugen Bracht, who was a highly respected landscape painter of “oriental motives”.

In 1887 he was invited by Prof. Ludwig Brackebusch to participate in a geographical and geological expedition surveying the Andes mountains starting in the province of San Juan  to the province of Catamarca  in Argentina’s NW. He later participated in other expeditions to the NE of Argentina, Paraguay and Brasil.

During his stay in Buenos Aires, Argentina, he met Wilhelmine Fehling, whom he married in 1891 and with whom he moved back to Berlin. They had four daughters, Charlotte, Marie Henriette, Wilhelmine Gertrud and Luise Irmgard.

Upon his return to Berlin Karl Oenike pursued a career as landscape painter, mainly in northern Europe. He was commissioned to paint castles, sceneries, reproduce historic scenes, etc. and participated in several exhibitions. He was a very prolific artist, using various techniques like engraving, watercolor, oil painting, etc. His best known artwork is “Einzug der Pilger”, an engraving showing the entry of pilgrims into the village of Bethlehem around 1894, which has been widely reproduced in diverse publications. But actually most of his work was landscape painting, where he depicted his "personal vision of nature".

But his years in the Southern region of South America “occupied a very important position, yes, a good part of his life work”. He left various reports on his trips, some of which can be found in the library of the Society for Geography in Berlin and in the Ibero-Amerikanisches Institut in Berlin. And his drawings, engravings and photos appeared in various works about South America.

He died on April 11, 1924, at the age of 62.

Expeditions
1888 – Geological Expedition in the Andean region of Argentina led by Prof. Ludwig Brackebusch covering the provinces of San Luis, San Juan, La Rioja, Catamarca and Jujuy.
1888 – Expedition to Salta by himself
1889 – Ethnological Expedition to Paraguay led by Prof.A.Jordan to survey the Guayaki tribe, one of the last Stone Age groups in existence.

Drawings in publications
 Ludwig Brackebusch – “Die Kordillerenpässe zwischen der argentinischen Republik und Chile“ (The mountain crossings between Argentina and Chile), ed. Zeitschrift Gesellschat für Erdkunde, t.27, 1892
 Ludwig Brackebusch – “Das Bergmannsleben in der Argentinischen Republik” (The Life of Miners in Argentina), ed. Westermanns Monatshefte, T.75, March 1894, p. 749-771 includes 15 drawings by K.Oenike
 Karl Oenike – “Skizzen aus Argentinien” (Notes on Argentina); 14 p incl. 20 drawings, pub. Von Fels zum Meer (1896)
 Dr.P.Ehrenreich – “Neue Mitteilungen ueber die Guayaki (Steinzeitmenschen) in Paraguay” (New reports on the Guayaki (Stone Age tribe) in Paraguay) in Globus Zeitschrift, T.LXXIII, Nr.5, p. 1-6, Ed. By F.Vieweg & Son, Braunschweig, Germany (1898) includes 1 drawing by K.Oenike
 Moritz Kronfeld – “Bilder-Atlas zur Pflanzengeographie” (Picture Atlas of Plants), Bibliographisches Institut, 1908, 192 pp, includes drawings by K.Oenike
 Dr. Herman Ten Kate - “Exotisme in de Kunst” (Exotism in Art), Elserevier’s Geillustreerd Maandschrift, Year XXIII, T. XLVI (July–December 1913), Amsterdam, The Netherlands

Paintings
There is no complete listing of his work, but we can mention the following paintings which are mentioned in recent auction house listings: The arrival of the Pilgrims (Einzug der Pilger); By the water’s edge; Summer lake with lilies and reeds; High Mountain grove; Botanical Gardens- Rio de Janeiro; Landscape with river and figure; French river landscape with large trees and woman walking; Palms in the jungle of Paraguay (Palmenlichtung im Urwald von Paraguay); Figures in Paraguayan landscape; Old oaks; Oven by the wood; Bavarian moor; San Bernardino-Paraguay; Landscape of Argentina, Big Tree and some men (Motiv aus Argentinien); Oberburg Manderscheid; Hain im Riesengebirge; William Tell; Bondgard; Am Waldsaum; Waldlichtung;  Pappeln am Menkiner See; Bispinger, Feldweg auf einer Bergkuppe und Bauernhaus;  Dorfschmiede by Menkin, Uckermark; Schloss Dyck; Brazilian Mountain Lake (Brasilianischer Bergsee); In the mountains of Cordoba in Argentina (In den Bergen von Cordoba in Argentinien);

Exhibitions
This is only a partial listing.
 63. Ausstellung der Kgl. Akademie der Kuenste in Berlin (1892)
 Grosse Berliner Kunstausstellung, from 1893-1924 he regularly participated this annual Art Exhibition
 Kunstverein Bremen, Germany, 28. Grosse Gemalde Ausstellung (3.1 to 4.18.1892)
 Deutsche Kunstabteilung, Chicago World Exhibition (1893)
 Kunstverein Bremen, 29. Grosse Gemalde Ausstellung (March 1894)
 Kunstverein Bremen, 30. Grosse Gemalde Ausstellung (3.1 to 4.15.1896)
 Thuringer Ausstellungsverein Bildender Kunstler, Jena, Germany (May 1902)
 Kunstverein Wiesbaden, Germany, Ausstellung Internationaler Graphik des 19.Jahrhunderts (1912)

External links
Ibero-Amerikanisches Institut Preussischer Kulturbesitz, Berlin, Germany
Kunstverein Wiesbaden
 Katalog der Allgemeinen Kunstaustellung des Kunstvereins Bremen (1.6 – 30.9.1890)
 Thuringischer Ausstellungsverein Bildender Kunst (5-1902)
Elserevier’s Geillustreerd Maandschrift

Notes

1862 births
1924 deaths
Huguenots
19th-century German painters
19th-century German male artists
German male painters
20th-century German painters
20th-century German male artists
German landscape painters
20th-century German printmakers